Eremocoris setosus is a species of dirt-colored seed bug in the family Rhyparochromidae. It is found in North America.

References

Further reading

 
 
 
 

Lygaeoidea